André Suarès, born Isaac Félix Suarès (12 June 1868, Marseille – 7 September 1948, Saint-Maur-des-Fossés) was a French poet and critic.

From 1912 onwards, he was one of the four "pillars" of the Nouvelle Revue Française, along with André Gide, Paul Claudel and Paul Valéry.

In 1931, he contributed to a book entitled Marsiho. In this work, written in Paris, he revealed his true feelings about his hometown (Marseille).

André Suarès died in 1948, aged 80.

Bibliography

Literature
 Lettres d'un solitaire sur les maux du Temps (1899)
Images de la grandeur (1901)
Le Livre de l'émeraude (1902)
Sur la mort de mon frère (1904)
Xénies (1923)
Saint-Juin de la Primevère (1926)
Clowns (1927)
Marsiho (1931)
Cirque (1932)
Le Voyage du condottière (1932)
Cité, nef de Paris (1933)
Le Crépuscule sur la mer (1933), réédition partielle du Livre de l'émeraude
Temples grecs, maisons des Dieux (1937)
Cantique des cantiques (1938)
Passion (1939)
Paris (1950), posthume
Rosalinde sur l'eau (1950), posthume
Le Paraclet (1976), posthume
Vita-Nova (1977), posthume
Talisman d'Avila (1980), posthume
Ce Monde doux-amer (1980), posthume
Don Juan (1987), posthume
Landes et marines (1991), posthume
Provence (1993), posthume
Rome (1998), posthume

Poetry
Éloge d'Homère par Ronsard (1886)
Airs (1900)
Bouclier du zodiaque (1907)
Lais et sônes (1909)
Amour (1917)
Sous le pont de la Lune (1925)
Haïkaï de l'occident (1926)
Soleil de Jade (1928)
Poèmes du temps qui meurt (1929)
Rêves de l'ombre (1937)
Antiennes du Paraclet (1976), posthume
Caprices (1977), posthume
Poétique (1980), posthume

Theater
Les Pèlerins d'Emmaüs (1893)
La Tragédie d'Élektre et Oreste (1905)
Cressida (1913)
Les bourdons sont en fleur (1917)
Polyxène (1925)
Hélène chez Archimède (1949), posthume
Minos et Parsiphaé (1950), posthume
Ellys et Thanatos (1978), posthume
Vues critiques
Tolstoï (1899)
Wagner (1899)
Le portrait d'Ibsen (1908)
Visite à Pascal (1909)
Tolstoï vivant (1911) - réédition enrichie de l'édition de 1899
Dostoïevski (1911)
Trois Hommes : Pascal, Ibsen, Dostoïevski (1913)
François Villon (1914)
Chroniques de Caërdal : Portraits (1914)
Péguy (1915)
Cervantès (1916)
Poète tragique : portrait de Prospero - sur Shakespeare (1921)
La Bièvre, Delvau, Huysmans, Mithouard (1922)
Puissance de Pascal (1923)
Stendhal, Verlaine, Baudelaire, Gérard de Nerval et autres gueux (1923)
Goethe le grand Européen (1932)
Portraits sans modèle (1935)
Trois Grands Vivants, Cervantès, Tolstoï, Baudelaire (1937)

Essais et pamphlets
Chroniques du Lieutenant X (1900)
Voici l'homme, (1906)
Sur la vie Tome I (1909), Tome II (1910), Tome III (1912)
De Napoléon (1912)
Idées et Visions (1913)
Chroniques de Caërdal : Essais (1913)
Commentaires sur la guerre des boches : Tome I, Nous et eux (1915), Tome II, C'est la guerre (1915), Tome III Occident (1915), Tome IV, La nation contre la race, la fourmilière (1916), Tome V La nation contre la race, République et barbares (1916)
Remarques (1917–18)
Tombeau de Jean Letellier, un jeune soldat de la grande guerre (1920)
Debussy (1922)
Présences (1925)
Musique et poésie (1928)
Variables, (1929)
Le martyre de Saint-Augustin (1929)
Musiciens (1931)
Vues sur Napoléon (1933)
Vues sur l'Europe (1936)
Valeurs, (1936)
Remarques
Présentations de la France 1940-44 (1951), posthume
Pour un portrait de Goya (1983), posthume
Âmes et visages (1989), posthume
Portraits et préférences (1991), posthume
Idéées et visions (2002), posthume - anthologie coll. Bouquins Tome I
Valeurs (2002), posthume - anthologie coll. Bouquins Tome II

Letters
 Paul Claudel (1951)
 Romain Rolland (1954)
 (1955)
 Antoine Bourdelle (1961)
 Charles Péguy (1961)
 André Gide (1963)
 Georges Rouault (1969)
 Jacques Copeau (1982)
 (1984)
 Yves Le Febvre (1986)
 Jean Paulhan (1987)
 Jacques Doucet (1994)

This article was translated from the French Wikipedia

References

1868 births
1948 deaths
20th-century French poets
19th-century French Jews
Jewish poets
Writers from Marseille
French male poets
20th-century French Jews